Limnae or Limnai may refer to:
 Limnae (Bithynia), an ancient town in Bithynia, now in Turkey
 Limnae (Cappadocia), an ancient town in Cappadocia, now in Turkey
 Limnae (Peloponnesus), an ancient Greek town on the borderlands between Messenia and Laconia
 Limnae (Sparta), an ancient Greek settlement in Sparta
 Limnae (Thrace), an ancient Greek city in Thrace
 Limnae in Pisidia, a former city and bishopric, presently Gaziri in Anatolia and a Latin Catholic titular see

See also
Limnaea (disambiguation)